The U-18 Baseball World Cup is the 18-and-under baseball world championship sanctioned by the International Baseball Federation (IBAF) and its successor, the World Baseball Softball Confederation (WBSC), and was first held in 1981 in the United States. Because it is a world championship, the results of the U-18 Baseball World Cup affect the WBSC World Rankings.

Several players who have participated in the U-18 Baseball World Cup have gone on to stardom at the professional level, including Japan's Yu Darvish, USA's Clayton Kershaw, Francisco Lindor and Buster Posey, and Cuba's Yasiel Puig and Aroldis Chapman, among many others.

Prior to 2010, the IBAF organized the World Junior Baseball Championship. The WBSC was created in 2013 when the IBAF merged with the International Softball Federation.

Results

Notes

Medal table

1Chinese Taipei is the official WBSC designation for the team representing the state officially referred to as the Republic of China, more commonly known as Taiwan. (See also political status of Taiwan for details.)

See also
Baseball awards#World
International Baseball Federation
World Baseball Softball Confederation

References

 
under
Youth baseball competitions
World Cup
World youth sports competitions
Recurring sporting events established in 1981
World Baseball Softball Confederation competitions